{{Infobox boxing match
| fight date = June 24, 1995
| Fight Name = The Devil and Mr. Jones
| location = Convention Hall, Atlantic City, New Jersey, US
| image = 
| fighter1 = Roy Jones Jr.
| nickname1 = Junior
| record1 = 28–0 (24 KO)
| height1 = 5 ft 11 in
| weight1 = 168 lb
| style1 = Orthodox
| hometown1 = Pensacola, Florida, US
| recognition1 = IBF super middleweight champion[[The Ring (magazine)|The Ring]] No. 2 ranked pound-for-pound fighter2-division world champion
| fighter2 = Vinny Pazienza
| nickname2 = The Pazmanian Devil
| record2 = 40–5 (27 KO)
| hometown2 = Cranston, Rhode Island, US
| height2 = 5 ft 7 in
| weight2 = 168 lb
| style2 = Orthodox
| recognition2 = 2-division world champion
| titles = IBF super middleweight title
|result= Jones Jr. wins via 6th–round TKO
}}

Roy Jones Jr. vs. Vinny Pazienza, billed as The Devil and Mr. Jones was a professional boxing match contested on June 24, 1995 for the IBF super middleweight championship.

Background
After defeating James Toney to capture the IBF super middleweight title, Roy Jones would successfully defend the title against Antoine Byrd before being matched up against former WBA light middleweight champion Vinny Pazienza. Pazienza had won that title on October 1, 1991 but just over a month later on November 12, he was involved in a near-fatal car crash that fractured his neck and nearly cost him his boxing career. Though doctors had informed him that his boxing career was over, Pazienza returned to boxing after a 13-month layoff to defeat future WBC light middleweight champion Luis Santana by unanimous decision. Pazienza would then move up two divisions to super middleweight and won nine consecutive fights (including two against future hall-of-famer Roberto Durán) before landing the fight with Jones. Jones was regarded as one of the best fighters in the sport and was ranked at number two on The Ring'' pound-for-pound list (Pernell Whitaker was number one). As a result, Pazienza was installed as a massive underdog with Jones being listed as a 12–1 favorite, though one Las Vegas oddsmaker listed the odds at 100–1 in Jones' favor. Pazienza shrugged off his underdog status, however, stating "It makes me all the more determined to prove him wrong. And, besides, I'm most dangerous when I'm an underdog"

The Fight
Pazienza proved to be no match for Jones, who would dominate the duration of the fight. Pazienza tried to be aggressive in the early parts of the fight, but Jones would use his superior skills to thwart Pazienza's offense and by the third round, Jones had opened a cut above Pazienza's right eye. In the fourth round, Jones would become the first fighter in the history of compubox to go an entire round without being hit by an opponent as Pazienza was unable to connect with any of the five punches he threw in that round. Jones would also bust Pazienza's nose open in that round as well. With less than a minute to go in round six, Jones would score a knockdown over Pazienza after a left hook followed by a combination sent Pazienza to the canvas. Though Pazienza was clearly shaken from the exchange, he was allowed to continue, but Jones quickly put him down again with a right hand with 25 seconds left in the round. The referee again let Pazienza continue, prompting Jones to almost immediately land a six-punch combination that sent Pazienza crashing to the canvas for the third time in the round. The referee then called the fight with two seconds left in the round, giving Jones the victory by technical knockout.

References

1995 in boxing
Pazienza
1995 in sports in New Jersey
June 1995 sports events in the United States
Boxing matches at Boardwalk Hall